Betty Schrampfer Azar is the author of the Azar Grammar Series for students of English as a second or foreign language. A staple in English language teaching for more than three decades, the series contains dozens of books and is widely used throughout the globe.

Azar is a proponent of Grammar-Based Teaching in which grammar serves as the starting point and foundation for the development of all language skills — speaking, listening, writing, and reading.
 
The series is entering its fifth edition. With the addition of co-author Stacy A. Hagen in 2006, the series is now known as the Azar-Hagen Grammar Series.

There are three principal textbooks in the series: Understanding and Using English Grammar, Fundamentals of English Grammar and Basic English Grammar.

In 2017, TESOL International Association named the Betty Azar Travel Grant for Practicing ESL ESL/EFL Teachers in her honor. This grant helps pay for participants to travel to the annual TESOL conference.

Following the retirement of Betty S. Azar and her staff, www.azargrammar.com shut down on Tuesday, November 10, 2020. The Site was to officially shut down on Saturday, October 31, 2020, although it remained operational until Tuesday, November 10, 2020.

References

External links
 AzarGrammar.com 
 Betty Schrampfer overview At WorldCat

American educators
Living people
Year of birth missing (living people)